Spider-Man: Far From Home (Original Motion Picture Soundtrack) is the film score to the Columbia Pictures / Marvel Studios film Spider-Man: Far From Home composed by Michael Giacchino. The soundtrack album was released by Sony Classical on June 28, 2019.

Background
Spider-Man: Homecoming composer Michael Giacchino was confirmed to return to score Far From Home in October 2018.

Track listing
All music composed by Michael Giacchino except where otherwise noted.

Additional music
Whitney Houston's "I Will Always Love You" plays during the Marvel Studios opening logo as part of the film's opening "in memoriam" scene. "Back in Black" by AC/DC (which was previously featured in Iron Man), "I Wanna Be Your Boyfriend" by The Ramones and "Vacation" by The Go-Go's are also featured in the film. More vacation-themed and European songs are featured in the film as well.

References

2019 soundtrack albums
2010s film soundtrack albums
Marvel Cinematic Universe: Phase Three soundtracks
Sony Music soundtracks
Spider-Man film soundtracks
Spider-Man (2017 film series)
Michael Giacchino soundtracks
Sony Classical Records soundtracks